Robert Paul Anderson (born March 31, 1938) is a former American football halfback in the National Football League for the New York Giants.  He played college football at the United States Military Academy and was drafted in the ninth round of the 1960 NFL Draft.

References

External links
 

1938 births
Living people
American football halfbacks
College football announcers
Army Black Knights football players
New York Giants players
All-American college football players
College Football Hall of Fame inductees
Sportspeople from Elizabeth, New Jersey
Players of American football from New Jersey
Military personnel from New Jersey